This is a list of cricket grounds in Kenya.  Following initial colonisation by the Portuguese, Kenya gradually came under influence of the British Empire in the latter part of the 19th century and in the first half of the 20th century. Cricket was probably introduced to the country in the 1880s by the British.  Since then and following independence the sport has continued to grow, with Kenya being in recent history one of the stronger Associate members of the International Cricket Council.  The grounds included in this list have held at least one first-class, List A or Twenty20 match.  Additionally, some have held One Day Internationals and Twenty20 Internationals.

References

External links
Cricket grounds in Kenya at CricketArchive.

Grounds
Kenya